The main bodies of the European Union and the Euratom are:
 the seven principal institutions of the European Union, including the one which is an international entity (the European Central Bank)
 other bodies of the EU established through primary (treaty) legislation, either as international law bodies (the European Investment Bank Group entities, the European University Institute, the European Stability Mechanism and the Unified Patent Court) or as bodies without juridical personality (the European Ombudsman, the advisory bodies to the European Union)
 the agencies, decentralised independent bodies and joint undertakings of the European Union and the Euratom, which are bodies of the EU established as juridical persons through secondary legislation,
 other bodies of the EU established through secondary legislation, which lack juridical personality (e.g. European Data Protection Supervisor)
 the inter-institutional services 

Apart from them, some several other bodies exist.

Institutions of the EU 

The Treaty on European Union in Article 13 lists seven institutions of the European Union, including one which is an international entity (the European Central Bank).

International law entities of the EU (other than EBC)

European Investment Bank Group bodies
In addition, the European Investment Bank is the European Union's long-term lending institution. The EIB supports the EU's priority objectives, especially boosting sustainable growth and job creation. The Group also includes the European Investment Fund and the EIB Institute.

European University Institute

European Stability Mechanism

Unified Patent Court

Other treaty-established bodies

Advisory bodies 

There are a number of other bodies and agencies of note that are not formal institutions. There are two consultative committees to the EU institutions: the Economic and Social Committee (EESC) advises on economic and social policy (principally relations between workers and employers) being made up of representatives of various industries and work sectors. Its 344 members (with an additional nine members joining following the accession of Croatia to the EU), appointed by the Council for four-year terms, are organised into three fairly equal groups representing employers, employees and other various interests; while the European Committee of the Regions (CoR) is composed of representative of regional and local authorities who hold an electoral mandate. It advises on regional issues. It has 344 members, organised in political groups, appointed every four years by the Council.

European Ombudsman

The European Ombudsman deals with citizens grievances against the Union's institutions and is elected for five-year terms by the Parliament.

Agencies, decentralised independent bodies, corporate bodies and joint undertakings 

A number of decentralised, executive and Eurarom agencies, decentralised independent bodies and joint undertakings exist, which are bodies of the EU or Euratom established as juridical persons through secondary EU legislation. These include the European Environment Agency and Europol.

Other bodies and inter-institutional services
There are also three inter-institutional bodies lacking juridical personality: the Publications Office, the oldest one, which publishes and distributes official publications from the European Union bodies; and the two relatively new: the European Personnel Selection Office (EPSO), a recruitment body which organises competitions for posts within Union institutions; and the European Administrative School, which provides specific training for the staff of Union institutions. 

Another body is the anti-fraud office OLAF whose mission is to protect the financial interests of the European Union. 

The European Data Protection Supervisor ensures the institutions respect citizens' privacy rights in relation to data processing.

References

See also
 Glossary of European Union concepts, acronyms, & jargon
 List of the names of bodies of the European Union in its official languages